Fahrenheit 451 is an interactive fiction game released in 1984 and based on the 1953 novel of the same name by Ray Bradbury. Originally released by software company Trillium, it was re-released in 1985 under the company’s new name Telarium.

The player's goal is to help Guy Montag, the main character from the novel, to evade the authorities and make contact with an underground movement. Bradbury contributed to the game by writing the prologue and responses of the game's intelligent computer "Ray".

Publication history 
The plot and text of the game were written by Len Neufeld (known for his previous authorship of books in the Be an Interplanetary Spy interactive novel series), working under the aegis of Byron Preiss Visual Publications.

The game was released for the Apple II, Atari ST, Commodore 64, MS-DOS, Macintosh, MSX and Tandy computers.

Plot 
At the ending of Fahrenheit 451, former Fireman Guy Montag is a fugitive, wanted for murder for killing his supervisor and stealing contraband books. The game takes place five years later. A pointless war has swept across the country, leading to martial law by the Firemen. Now an agent for the literary underground, Montag makes his way to New York. His mission is to break into the heavily guarded New York Public Library on 42nd Street. The books themselves were burned, but the contents had first been transferred to microcassette. The microcassettes need to be retrieved and uploaded into the Underground's information network. Along the way, he discovers that Clarisse McClellan, the young woman who inspired him to rebellion, is still alive.

Challenges for the player involve finding ways to alter one's appearance, fingerprints, and "chemindex" (body chemistry) in order to evade detection. Other issues arise in finding food to eat and safe places to rest. The player must also make contact with members of the Underground hiding in the city, through the use of a lighter and literary quotations.

In the end, Montag is able to break into the Central Library and meet up with Clarisse. The microcassettes are found and transmitted on the information network to resistance cells all over the world. While Montag and Clarisse achieve victory in saving the extensive collection of literature, it costs them their lives as firemen storm the office after the last cassette is transmitted, immolating them both.

Reception 
In the 1980s, a reviewer praised the "gripping prose" and the "unique approach of obtaining and using literary quotations". German reviewers maintained the complexity of the plot, the graphics and the large number of scenes and non-fictional characters.

In 1993, a German study about the history of interactive fiction described Fahrenheit 451 as a highly complex, interactive computer fairy tale. It referred to the adventure as a play with classic literature quotations.

Notes

External links 
 Fahrenheit 451 CASA: The Classic Adventure Solution Archive
 Text version of the game manual
 Fahrenheit 451 at Museum of Computer Adventure Game History by Howard Feldman
 Fahrenheit 451 at Adventureland by Hans Persson and Stefan Meier
 
 Fahrenheit 451 at the Interactive Fiction Database

1980s interactive fiction
1984 video games
Adaptations of works by Ray Bradbury
Apple II games
Atari ST games
Classic Mac OS games
Commodore 64 games
DOS games
Dystopian video games
MSX games
Science fiction video games
Single-player video games
Telarium games
Video games based on novels
Video games developed in the United States
Video games set in New York City
Video games set in the 2060s